The Worshipful Company of Painter-Stainers is one of the livery companies of the City of London. An organisation of painters of metals and wood is known to have existed as early as 1283. A similar organisation of stainers, who generally worked on staining cloth for decorative wall hangings, existed as early as 1400. The two bodies merged in 1502; the new organisation was incorporated under a royal charter in 1581.

Today, the company is less a trade association of painters and more a charitable company, with the promotion of education in the fine and decorative arts and crafts as its main theme. The Painters' Company Scholarship Scheme was established in 2012 to support undergraduates every year at London Art Colleges. Each student receives £5,000 annually from the beginning of their second year until they complete their studies, and they are known as a Painters' Company Scholar. The students are selected entirely on merit, and this is the most meritocratically awarded scholarship for art students in London today.

The Painters Company also co-sponsors one of the largest UK open art competitions: the Lynn Painter-Stainers Prize was created in 2005 by the Worshipful Company of Painter-Stainers and the Lynn Foundation to encourage the very best creative representational painting and promote the skill of draftsmanship. It awards prize money of £30,000.

Eleven Liverymen have held the office of Lord mayor of London since 1922.

The Company ranks twenty-eighth in the order of precedence of livery companies. The company's motto is Amor Queat Obedientiam, Latin for Love Can Compel Obedience.

The Master for the year ensuing 19 October 2015 is Anthony John Ward, son of the late Liveryman and scribe to the company, John Ward. The Clerk is Christopher John Twyman.

The livery company's hall is situated between Huggin Hill and Little Trinity Lane, in the ward of Queenhithe.

Annual prizes

Lynn Painter-Stainers Prize

The Lynn Painter-Stainers Prize was created in 2005 by the Worshipful Company of Painter-Stainers and the Lynn Foundation for representational painting and draughtsmanship.

Winner and Second Prize Winner
The Winner receives £15,000. A Second Prize Winner is awarded £4,000.

People's Prize
An award of £2,000.

The Young Artist Award
An award of £4,000.

Brian Botting Prize for Figurative Drawing
This Prize was established in 2015 with a bequest following the death of Brian Botting. A prize of £5,000 is awarded annually to a young artist who is 30 years of age or under. Originally a stand-alone Worshipful Company of Painter-Stainers prize, brought under the umbrella of the Lynn Painter-Stainers Prize in 2017.

New English Art Club Prize
This Prize of £200 is awarded to an exhibitor at the Annual Exhibition of the New English Art Club.

In 2015 the winner was Michael Whittlesea.

Armed Forces Art Society Prize
This Prize of £100 is awarded at the Society's Annual Exhibition held at the Mall Galleries.

In 2015 the winner was Caroline De Peyrecave.

Photography Prize
This Prize of £1,000 is awarded to a final year student at the annual Royal College of Art Degree Show. Possibly no longer awarded.

In 2014 the winner was Helen McGhie.

Gordon Luton Award for Fine Art
This Prize of £2,000 is awarded to a Graduate or Postgraduate student in the fine art of painting to assist the winner to become commercially viable. The winner is selected from candidates exhibiting at the final year shows of the Royal College of Art, the Slade School of Fine Art and the Royal Academy Schools. There are also two Runners-up Prizes of £500. Possibly no longer awarded.

In 2014 the winner was Marlene Steyne from the Royal College of Art and the Runners-up Prizes were awarded to Alex Clarke from Royal Academy Schools, and Chao Lu of the Royal College of Art.

Distinguished members
Through the centuries many distinguished artists have been members of the company, including:

Robert Aggas
Joshua Reynolds P.R.A.
Godfrey Kneller
Peter Lely
 James Thornhill
William Dobson
Peter Monamy
Lord Leighton P.R.A.
John Millais P.R.A.
Juliet Pannett
Edward Poynter P.R.A.
Alfred Munnings P.R.A.
Walter Thomas Monnington
Frank Dicksee P.R.A.
Gerald Kelly P.R.A.
Charles Wheeler P.R.A.
Roger de Grey P.R.A.
Theo Ramos
Ken Howard OBE RA
Daphne Todd OBE PPRP

Other distinguished members have included:
Edwin Lutyens P.R.A.
7th Duke of Wellington
Field Marshal Lord Alexander
Marshal of the Royal Air Force Lord Tedder
Gerald Templer
Colin Cole
Charles Guthrie, Baron Guthrie of Craigiebank
Roger Wheeler
Hugh Casson R.A.
Denis Rooke
Denis Thatcher
Carl Aarvold
Philip Dowson P.R.A.

Company Chaplains and Church
 Reverend Tim Handley 
 St James Garlickhythe
Guild of Saint Luke

References

External links
 The Painter-Stainers' Company
 / The Magister Painters' Company
 A brief history of the house-painting trade in London ca.1660-1850 can be found in this essay by the English historian of paint and colour, Patrick Baty
 Lynn Painters-Stainers prize

Painter-Stainers
1502 establishments in England
British art awards
Photography awards